Cyrus Clement James Pitman (born March 24, 1944) is the former Bishop of Eastern Newfoundland and Labrador.

Pitman was educated at the Memorial University of Newfoundland. Ordained in 1967, he served at Channel, Flower's Cove, Petty Harbour, and Conception Bay South before becoming Archdeacon of Avalon in 2002.

Notes

1944 births
Memorial University of Newfoundland alumni
Anglican bishops of Eastern Newfoundland and Labrador
Anglican Church of Canada archdeacons
21st-century Anglican Church of Canada bishops
Living people